Temple Beth-El is a synagogue located at 12 Church St., Hornell, New York. Built in 1946, it was founded as Orthodox. In 1950 the Rabbi was Harry Zwick, and congregation officers were: president Isadore Spitulnik, vice-president Louis Eisenberg MD, financial secretary Joseph Cropp, recording secretary Edward Schulimson, treasurer Hyman Jacobsen.

Temple Beth-El was unable to support a full-time rabbi following Hornell's economic and demographic collapse after the closure of the Erie Railroad's repair shops, its main industry, in 1960. It operated briefly as a Conservative congregation, but is currently (2014) inactive. In 2010 it was a target for graffiti, a red pentagon and the initials FBG sprayed on the side.

The building reflects the pattern of Jewish settlement seen in small towns across New York State in the mid-nineteenth and early twentieth centuries and illustrates the economic, social, and cultural impact this ethnic and religious group made to the community. Previous to the synagogue, the congregation worshiped in local homes and later the Erlich Hebrew Center, a Jewish center established in a downtown commercial building (converted into studios for WLEA after the Jewish community moved out). After World War II, the center proved to be inadequate and the congregation pooled its resources. Renamed Temple Beth-El, the congregation was able to build its own house of worship near the center of the city where other religious houses of worship were prominently sited. Design and construction were guided by a building committee and the synagogue was dedicated in 1947. The only change made to the building since its dedication was a new roof and ceiling in the worship space in 1976. The presence of the synagogue reinforces the fact that the congregation was and still is part of the Hornell community.

In 2016 it was listed on the National Register of Historic Places.

See also

National Register of Historic Places listings in Steuben County, New York

References 

Former synagogues in New York (state)
Synagogues on the National Register of Historic Places in New York (state)
Buildings and structures in Steuben County, New York
Synagogues completed in 1946
1946 establishments in New York (state)
Jewish organizations established in 1946
National Register of Historic Places in Steuben County, New York
Churches in Steuben County, New York
Hornell, New York
Orthodox synagogues in New York (state)